Ninety Miles Project is both a jazz album and documentary film recorded on Havana, Cuba, in May 2010, and features American jazz artists Christian Scott, Stefon Harris, and David Sánchez.  The project also features Cuban composers and artists Rember Duharte and Harold Lopez Nussa. The album was released in 2010 on Concord Picante Records. The follow-up record, Ninety Miles Live at Cubadisco, was released on September 24, 2012.

Background
The name alludes to the stretch of waters between America, Puerto Rico, and Cuba. The project extends a larger, more organic story—of jazz as a conduit for connection between the U.S. and Cuba and an expression of common roots—which is as old as the music itself, and which has been altered and often severely curtailed during the last half-century, due to travel restrictions related to the continuing U.S. embargo of Cuba.

The American members of Ninety Miles continue to tour, including shows at The Clifford Brown Jazz Festival, The Atlanta Jazz Festival, and at the Hollywood Bowl opening for Arturo Sandoval and The Buena Vista Social Club.

Reception
In late 2011, both Downbeat Magazine and Jazziz Magazine featured cover stories on the project with Jazziz Magazine stating that the hyperkinetic polyrhythms laid down by pianist Rember Duharte’s group on the opening track, “Ñengueleru,” clearly distinguish this set from a conventional Latin-jazz date.

In his review of the album, Dave Gelly of the Observer wrote "Ninety miles is the distance separating Cuba from the US. After much hassle, these three US-based jazz musicians got to play with their Cuban counterparts in Havana and this is the result. It's well known that standards are ferociously high in Cuba, and the sheer sophistication of the musical dialogue is hugely impressive".

Track listing
 Nengueleru (5:03) (written by Rember Duharte)
 E'Cha (4:14) (Harold Lopez-Nussa)
 City Sunrise (6:45) (David Sanchez)
 The Forgotten Ones (3:52) (David Sanchez)
 Black Action Figure (6:21) (Stefon Harris)
 Congo (6:28) (Rember Duharte)
 And This Too Shall Pass (9:28) (Stefon Harris)
 Brown Belle Blues (4:59) (Stefon Harris)
 La Fiesta Va (5:48) (Harold Lopez-Nussa)

Album personnel
 Stefon Harris – vibraphone
 David Sanchez – tenor saxophone
 Christian Scott – trumpet (except "The Forgotten Ones" and "La Fiesta Va")

(Tracks 1, 6 & 8)
 Rember Duharte – piano, vox (track 6)
 Osmar Salazar – electric bass
 Eduardo Barroetabena – drums
 Jean Roberto San Miguel - bata, congas, percussion

(Tracks 2, 3, 5, 7 & 9)
 Harold Lopez-Nussa – piano
 Yandy Martinez Gonzalez – bass
 Ruy Adrian Lopez-Nussa – drums
 Edgar Martinez Ochoa – congas, djembe, percussion, bata (track 4)

Chart performance

References

2011 albums
Jazz albums by American artists
Jazz albums by Cuban artists